Huntley is a village in McHenry and Kane counties, Illinois, United States. As of the 2020 census it had a population of 27,740. It is a part of the Chicago metropolitan area.

Geography 
Neighboring communities are Lake in the Hills to the northeast, Algonquin to the east, Gilberts to the southeast, Pingree Grove to the south, and Hampshire to the southwest. Unincorporated Union is to the northwest.

Demographics

2020 census

2000 Census
As of the census of 2000, there were 5,730 people, 2,324 households, and 1,756 families residing in the village. The racial makeup of the village was 94.94% White, 0.44% African American, 0.17% Native American, 2.13% Asian, 0.00% Pacific Islander, 1.26% from other races, and 1.06% from two or more races.  4.28% of the population were Hispanic or Latino of any race.

There were 2,324 households, out of which 31.2% had children under the age of 18 living with them, 67.3% were married couples living together, 5.9% had a female householder with no husband present, and 24.4% were non-families. 20.7% of all households were made up of individuals, and 9.9% had someone living alone who was 65 years of age or older.  The average household size was 2.47 and the average family size was 2.85.

In the village, the population was spread out, with 23.3% under the age of 18, 6.1% from 18 to 24, 31.3% from 25 to 44, 22.0% from 45 to 64, and 17.4% who were 65 years of age or older.  The median age was 37 years. For every 100 females, there were 95.5 males.  For every 100 females age 18 and over, there were 91.8 males.

The median income for a household in the village was $60,456, and the median income for a family was $65,433. Males had a median income of $44,524 versus $30,363 for females. The per capita income for the village was $27,451.  2.8% of the population and 1.9% of families were below the poverty line.   2.2% of those under the age of 18 and 1.9% of those 65 and older were living below the poverty line.

Government 
Huntley is governed as a village with an elected village president and a six-member board of trustees. Trustees are elected at-large to four-year staggered terms. The village president is Timothy Hoeft.

Transportation 

 The village is located along the "Golden Corridor" of Interstate 90/Northwest Tollway. It has direct access to I-90 via a full interchange at Illinois Route 47. Conversion of the interchange from an eastbound interchange to a full interchange was completed in November 2013.
 Illinois Route 47 serves as the chief north–south artery in Huntley. Handling over 20,000 vehicles a day, Route 47 was expanded from two to five lanes in 2011. Portions of Route 47 between Kreutzer Road and I-90 are six lanes. Route 47 connects to Woodstock to the north and Pingree Grove and Elburn to the south.
 Algonquin Road and Main Street/Huntley-Dundee Road act as the village's primary east–west routes. Algonquin Road is a four-lane divided highway that connects Route 47 to other suburbs to the east like Algonquin and Lake in the Hills. Main Street connects to Marengo and Harmony roads on the west (leading to U.S. Route 20 and towns like Marengo, Hampshire, and Union), while Huntley-Dundee Road connects to the Carpentersville-Dundee area to the east.
 Other important streets in the village include Ruth Road, Reed Road, Kreutzer Road, Haligus Road, Del Webb Boulevard, and Church Street. Reed and Kreutzer are local east–west roads, while Haligus, Ruth, and Church are local north–south streets. Del Webb Boulevard is the primary collector road in the Sun City neighborhood.
 The village is located along a branch of the Chicago & Northwestern Railroad, and thus many of the village's industries are near the railroad for convenient access to Elgin, Rockford, Chicago, and the rest of the continent.

Local newspapers 
 Northwest Herald – daily newspaper based in Crystal Lake which serves the greater McHenry County area
 Northwest Herald MyHometown – Northwest Herald's Huntley MyHometown homepage
 Daily Herald – daily newspaper based in Arlington Heights; serves cities in five counties incl. McHenry & Kane
 Huntley Farmside – weekly newspaper edited in St. Charles (Kane Co.), published in Downers Grove
 Sun Day – Biweekly/Weekly newspaper published by White Silo Media, Inc.; serves the communities of Sun City and Edgewater in Elgin.
The Voice — Monthly newspaper published by students in Huntley High School's journalism program

References

External links 

Chicago metropolitan area
Populated places established in 1851
Villages in Kane County, Illinois
Villages in McHenry County, Illinois
Villages in Illinois
1851 establishments in Illinois